West Rudham is a civil parish in the English county of Norfolk. The village straddles the A148 King's Lynn to Cromer road.
For the purposes of local government, it falls within the district of King's Lynn and West Norfolk.

History
The villages name means 'Rudda's homestead/village' or 'Rudda's hemmed-in land'.

There is evidence of occupation during the Middle Ages.

In 2016 and 2016 archaeological test pits were dug. The report was published in 2019.

Notes

External links

Villages in Norfolk
King's Lynn and West Norfolk
Civil parishes in Norfolk